Al Vergara (born December 20, 1979) is a Filipino former professional basketball player. He last played for the Muntinlupa Cagers of the Maharlika Pilipinas Basketball League (MPBL).

Vergara started off his professional career with the Singapore Slingers in the inaugural Asean Basketball League and played there for two seasons before joining Purefoods Tender Juicy Giants in the Philippine Basketball Association on loan from the Slingers, for the 2009 PBA Fiesta Conference.

An undrafted player in the 2006 PBA Draft, he played collegiately for the St. Francis of Assisi College Golden Doves, with PBA players Yancy and Ranidel de Ocampo, Ervin Sotto, and Erick Canlas.

Known for his athleticism, efficiency, and excellent plays, Vergara is best remembered for his role in the so-called Harbour Centre dynasty in the amateur Philippine Basketball League from 2006 to date.  That feat led to him being signed by the Singapore Slingers in 2008 and becoming its starting point guard to replace Jayson Castro.

References

1979 births
Filipino men's basketball players
Living people
Saigon Heat players
Magnolia Hotshots players
Singapore Slingers players
Filipino expatriate basketball people in Singapore
Point guards
Barako Bull Energy Boosters players
Filipino expatriate basketball people in Vietnam
Maharlika Pilipinas Basketball League players
Southeast Asian Games gold medalists for the Philippines
Southeast Asian Games medalists in basketball
Philippines men's national basketball team players
Competitors at the 2007 Southeast Asian Games
St. Francis Doves basketball players
Filipino men's basketball coaches